The Elsipogtog First Nation , formerly called the Big Cove Band, is a Miꞌkmaq First Nations band government in New Brunswick, Canada. , the registered Elsipogtog population is 3,313, with 2,587 living on reservations and 726 living off reservations.

History

"Elsipogtog" or "L'sipuktuk" means "River of Fire". The area was also called the stronghold of Sikniktuk. The traditional district was assigned to the Mi'kmaq clan of Alguimou, or L'kimu. Misel Alguimou was baptised Michael Augustine in the 18th century. Chief Michael Augustine signed the Peace and Friendship Treaty with the British in 1761, on behalf of the Richibucto Tribe of Mi'kmaq. The Richibucto Reserve was established in 1802 and later reduced in size. Richibucto Reserve # 16 is also known as the Big Cove Reserve. It was also called Big Cove, Mesigig Oalnei, and currently known as Elsipogtog (Pacifique spelling), or L'sipuktuk (Francis-Smith variation) and Elsipogtog First Nation located in Weldford Parish, New Brunswick.

Suicide rate
In 1992, there were seven suicides involving youth and over 75 suicide attempts in the community. An inquest was held and one of the recommendations was the creation of a position at the school to help support the youth in the community. The Elsipogtog Crisis Centre was also established in 1992 to help combat the large number of suicides in the community.

Youth justice system
In 1995, the community held a Justice Awareness Day that led to the creation of a justice alternative for youth. This was due to the high youth suicide rate in Elsipogtog and the large percentage of their youth in the court system. The Elsipogtog Restorative Justice Program includes pre- and post-charge diversion system, mediation, group conferencing programs, and sentencing circles. The program allows the community to "decide what [is] best for itself in terms of resolving wrongdoing...by striving to resolve the effects of an offender's behaviour.

Present day
The community has one school, Elsipogtog School, which has students from kindergarten to grade 8. Elsipogtog has a gas station, and a Royal Canadian Mounted Police detachment which is open throughout the week. There is a 7 day/week supermarket and a Pharmasave brand Pharmacy which are both 100% band owned and operated. There is also a holistic approach Health and Wellness Centre which has clinical and physician services available, as well as home and community care services, mental health and addiction services. There are community justice services available.

Kraft Hockeyville

After a fire that had destroyed the community's' arena the Chief Young Eagle in September 2020, Elsipogtog had entered into a Canada wide competition held by Kraft Heinz Canada in collaboration with the National Hockey League(NHL),and the National Hockey League Players Association(NHLPA) called Kraft Hockeyville, the competition which has started in 2006 allows for small communities in Canada for a chance to win $250,000 in arena upgrades, $10,000 worth of youth hockey equipment and a chance to host an NHL Pre Season game. Runners up receive $25,000 in arena upgrades and $10,000 for youth hockey equipment On March 20, 2021 the NHL and NHLPA announced the Top 4 communities hoping to become Kraft Hockeyville 2021, which were Elsipogtog, New Brunswick; Lumsden, Saskatchewan; Saint Adolphe, Manitoba; Bobcaygeon, Ontario. After two days of online voting on April 9 and 10 2021, NHL Commissioner Gary Bettman announced the winner live on Sportsnet Hockey Night in Canada, naming Elsipogtog Kraft Hockeyville 2021. The win came a week after the tragic loss of two community members in a fishing accident, Craig 'Jumbo' Sock who was a community leader and Seth Monahan  Due to the Covid-19 Pandemic the NHL Pre Season could not be held in 2021. With restriction being lifted, Elsipogtog was finally able to celebrate in October 2022 becoming Kraft Hockeyville 2021 with 3 days filled with activities; Day 1 of celebration was an Alumni Game which included NHL alumni players, and 3 female indigenous hockey players who have played for Team Canada and Team USA, also Elsipogtogs own NHL Player, Everett Sanipass, the alumni were split into teams, and gave minor hockey players to play alongside them. Day 2 included a day of activities, bouncy castles; a chance to get autographs from various players including New York Islanders legend Bryan Trottier, and a visit from The Stanley Cup. Mascots for the Ottawa Senators and Montreal Canadiens were also in attendance. And on Day 3, the Pre season Game was held at the J.K Irving Center in Bouctouche New Brunswick, community members were also treated for a chance to watch the Ottawa Senators and Montreal Canadiens practice before the game. Montreal Canadiens goaltender and Fredericton New Brunswick own Jake Allen was in the lineup. The Ottawa Senators defeated the Montreal Canadiens in a 3-2 win in Overtime.

Protest Against Shale-Gas Project
In May 2013, members of Elsipogtog First Nation demonstrated their concern over the proposed shale-gas project and 2D seismic imaging done near their reserve by SWN Resources Canada, a subsidiary of Southwestern Energy Company. Workers were on site to conduct seismic exploration that uses sound wave technology to create images of underground shale beds that might contain natural gas. Many residents voiced their concerns about the planned hydraulic fracturing (fracking) through social media. Throughout the Spring, Summer and Fall of 2013, protesters blocked SWN Resources Canada workers from accessing their seismic equipment.They blocked Route 116, 134, Hwy 11. On July 24, 2013, a video was recorded of a First Nations protester strapping herself to bundles of Geophones and other equipment used by SWN Resources Canada for seismic testing on the site. She slowed down the workers access to the equipment until the RCMP removed her later that day. On Sept 29th, SWN's trucks were blocked by a mystery van and protesters gathered in support.  Shortly afterward, a sacred fire was lit and maintained by a 12-year-old boy who watched over the prayers of the people. On October 1, 2013, a video was recorded of Elsipogtog First Nation Chief Arren James Sock delivering an eviction notice to SWN Resources Canada while dozens of protesters continued to block Route 134 in Rexton to prevent SWN Resources Canada from moving their exploration equipment.

On October 7, 2013, a video was recorded of Elsipogtog First Nation Chief Arren James Sock and New Brunswick Premier David Alward addressing the media regarding the blockage of the shale gas research and the injunction regarding the blockade.

On Thursday October 17, 2013, the Royal Canadian Mounted Police moved in to enforce a court injunction against a road blockade by shale-gas and fracking protesters. The situation "exploded in violence, sending dozens of people to jail and reducing five police cars to smouldering ruins".  The incident was made famous in a now-iconic photograph of activist Amanda Polchies kneeling before the police and holding an eagle feather. The RCMP said "more than 40 protesters were arrested for various offences including firearms offences, uttering threats, intimidation, mischief and for refusing to abide by a court injunction". T.J. Burke, the lawyer for the Elsipogtog First Nation, confirmed Chief Arren Sock was among those arrested in the clash. "Chief Arren Sock and a few of his band council members were released a few hours after their arrests". On Oct 18th, SWN applied for an indefinite injunction against a list of people including John and Jane Doe. Judge Rideout denied this injunction.  On 29 November 2013, another shale-gas protest resulted in the arrest of five men. Another report on the same day stated that 15 protesters were jailed for throwing rocks at vehicles. Numerous arrests continued to occur in 2014.

Composition
Elsipogtog First Nation is composed of two parts as shown:

Demographics

Richibucto 15

Population trend

Religious make-up (2001)

Income (2015)

Mother tongue (2016) 

Education (2006)

Notable people

Albert Levi, former chief and Order of Canada recipient
Mildred Milliea, language instructor and Order of Canada recipient
Everett Sanipass, former NHL player

See also
 First Nations in Atlantic Canada
 First Nations in New Brunswick
List of communities in New Brunswick

References

Communities in Kent County, New Brunswick
Mi'kmaq governments
Mi'kmaq in Canada